The 26th Annual SunBank 24 at Daytona was a 24-hour endurance sports car race held on January 30–31, 1988 at the Daytona International Speedway road course. The race served as the opening round of the 1988 IMSA GT Championship.

Victory overall and in the GTP class went to the No. 60 Castrol Jaguar Racing Jaguar XJR-9 driven by Martin Brundle, Raul Boesel, and John Nielsen. Victory in the GTO Class went to the No. 11 Roush Racing Merkur XR4Ti driven by Scott Pruett, Paul Miller, Bob Akin, and Pete Halsmer. Victory in the Lights class went to the No. 9 Essex Racing Service Tiga GT286 driven by David Simpson, Tom Hessert Jr., and David Loring. Victory in the GTU class went to the No. 71 Team Highball Mazda RX-7 driven by Amos Johnson, Dennis Shaw, and Bob Lazier.

Race results
Class winners in bold.

References

24 Hours of Daytona
1988 in sports in Florida
1988 in American motorsport